School of Synthesis is a musical school in Melbourne, Australia specializing in electronic music. School of Synthesis was formed in 2010 by ARIA Award-winning Australian music producer, composer, sound designer Davide Carbone and DJ and music producer Mike Callander. Carbone and Callander met at RMIT University in Melbourne where Callander was a student and Carbone a teacher in sound recording.

Apart from offering courses in Ableton Live, Logic Pro, Sound Design (featuring Native Instruments software Massive and Kontakt), Electronic Music Theory, Maschine and Mixing and Mastering, the school runs free monthly events that are intended to unite and promote artistry and electronic music production in Melbourne. In December 2012 School of Synthesis presented an event by Dutch techno producer/DJ Joris Voorn*. The attendees at this Masterclass were selected via a competition co-presented by Australia's largest Electronic Dance Music festival brand, Stereosonic.

The School of Synthesis was featured in an article in Broadsheet magazine which highlighted its contribution to promoting a culture of music production in Melbourne.

Notable tutors and artists of School of Synthesis include 

Davide Carbone,
Mike Callander,
Shaun Keyt,
Joris Voorn,
Chris Coe (Digital Primate),
Craig McWhinney (Haul Music),
Richard Mataska,

See also 
 Music of Australia

References 

Various contributors, All Music Guide to Electronica, Backbeat Books, San Francisco, 2001.

External links
 Encyclopedia of Electronic Music
 School of Synthesis

Music companies of Australia